Snuff Puppets is an Australian puppet theatre company founded in 1992. They combine elements of puppetry, live music, visual and physical theatre to tackle taboo topics and make political satire.

History 
Snuff Puppets originated in Canberra as part of Splinters Theatre of Spectacle. They moved to a dusty warehouse in the industrial working-class suburb of Footscray in Melbourne in 1992, and are now based in the historic Footscray Drill Hall. Snuff Puppets founding members were Pauline Cady, Simon Terrill, and the current artistic director Andy Freer.

The company tour with indoor and outdoor shows and roaming acts. The company refers to its roaming acts as interventions, where they play with traffic and shoppers.

The company takes direct action on political issues with appearances in political rallies in support for climate justice, world peace, third world debt relief, gay rights, Aboriginal civil rights and asylum seekers.

Snuff Puppets have toured over 25 countries, including New Zealand, China, Hong Kong, Taiwan, Korea, India, Indonesia, Japan, Thailand, Singapore, Austria, Belgium, Denmark, England, France, Netherlands, Hungary, Ireland, Italy, Portugal, Brazil, Chile, Peru, Romania and the Democratic Republic of the Congo.

Local communities have worked with Snuff Puppets with dozens of large-scale workshops undertaken in Australia, Denmark, England, India, Indonesia, Japan, South Korea, Netherlands, Singapore, Thailand, Brazil and the Democratic Republic of the Congo.

The troupe won the Spirit of the Fringe award from Melbourne Fringe and the Adelaide Fringe 2006 Circus / Physical Theatre Award.

The Victorian State Government and Maribyrnong City Council support Snuff Puppets with annual Arts Funding.

Response 
Realtime Magazine wrote that Snuff Puppets have a "commitment to pushing bad taste to its extreme".

In 2015, Snuff Puppet's promotional video for the installation "Everybody" went viral; copies of the video have been reported as being viewed nearly 1 billion times.

Works in repertoire

Shows
A Cruel Life
Circus Ole - with acrobat
The Dancing Cow Show
Everybody - Premiered Melbourne November 2012
Everybody / Installation - Premiered Melbourne February 2015
Forest In The Night
Nyet Nyet's Picnic - with Australian Indigenous Artists
Snuff Clubb
Snuff Party
Scarey
Wedhus Gembel - with Padepokan Seni from Yogyakarta, Indonesia

Workshops
People's Puppet Projects
Kidsnuff
Snuff Skool - Premiered Hong Kong 2014

Roaming acts
Bunyips - with Australian Indigenous Artists
The Boom Family
Cows and Butcher/Cowboy
Giant Crayfish- with the Bob Brown Foundation
Elephant
Human Body Parts  
Rhinocerus
Seagulls
Skullies
Snail

Footnotes

External links
Snuff Puppets
 

Puppet troupes
Theatre companies in Australia
Puppetry in Australia
Arts in Melbourne